Shima Nikpour (born April 27, 1988) is an Iranian actress who has been active since 1988.

Filmography

References

External links
 
 shima nikpour in satin
 shima nikpour in vaharani
 nikpour in niksalehi
 nikpour shima in topnaz iran

1982 births
Living people
People from Tehran
Actresses from Tehran
Iranian film actresses
21st-century Iranian actresses